The list of Theta Xi brothers includes initiated and honorary members of Theta Xi.

Notable alumni
Notable members are listed by name and chapter.

Arts and entertainment 
Jay Alders (Gamma Mu 11), Internationally acclaimed Visual Artist. Named "Best Surf Artist of the Decade" by Brazil's Alma Surf Magazine
Richard Boone (Tau), Emmy winning actor, (former, blackballed)
Jim Davis (Kappa Kappa 159), creator of Garfield comic strip
Bruce Davison, Golden Globe-winning actor
Bill Dedman (Iota 1089), Pulitzer Prize-winning investigative reporter and bestselling author
Bill Doleman (Alpha Epsilon), Studio Analyst for Root Sport Southwest
Buddy De Sylva (Alpha Nu 78), Oscar-nominated composer, producer, and executive
Henderson Forsythe, Tony award-winning actor and one of the actors who has played Colonel Sanders for KFC
 Ferde Grofé (Alpha Nu 340), Noted Composer
Charles Lederer, film screenwriter, Tony award double winner, producer
Jack Lindquist (Alpha Nu 263), former president of Disneyland (1990–1994)
Dudley Nichols, Oscar-winning screenwriter
Richard Reeves (Gamma 722), Author and syndicated columnist
Patrick Simmons (Beta Beta 272) Musician, author and founding member of The Doobie Brothers

Business and education 
Marshall Goldsmith (Kappa 721), American executive leadership coach and author
 Travis Kalanick (Alpha Zeta 1223), Founder & ex-CEO of Uber
 Palmer C. Ricketts (Alpha 84), Ninth president of Rensselaer Polytechnic Institute
 William F. Sharpe (Alpha Zeta 402), Awarded the 1990 Nobel Prize in Economics for his Capital Asset Pricing Model.

Government, military and politics 
Alva B. Adams (Beta 209, Yale University) - U.S. Senator from Colorado 1923-1924, 1933-1941
Ronald L. Burgess, Jr. (Beta Zeta 409, Auburn University) - 17th Director of the Defense Intelligence Agency
Frank Church (Tau Chapter), Stanford University - United States Senator from Idaho 1957-1981
Jim Donelon (Beta Xi 27, University of New Orleans) - Louisiana Insurance Commissioner, Former State Representative
Mayson Foster (Beta Pi 42, Southeastern Louisiana University) – Mayor of Hammond, Louisiana
Claude Harris, Jr. (Alpha Lambda 421) (University of Alabama) - US Congress Representative from Alabama (1987–1993); Circuit Judge, 1977–1985; was not a candidate for renomination to the One Hundred Third Congress in 1992
John S. McCain, Jr. (Kappa Lambda 82 - Alumni Initiate - Old Dominion University) Admiral USN (Ret.) 
Donald H. Magnuson (Upsilon Chapter) - U.S. Congressman from Washington
 Eric O'Neill (Beta Zeta 707, Auburn University) - a former American FBI operative. He worked as an Investigative Specialist, of the Special Surveillance Group (SSG), and played a pivotal role in the arrest and life imprisonment conviction of his fellow agent, Robert Hanssen, for spying on behalf of the Soviet Union and Russia.  Subject of the movie Breach
James S. Voss (Beta Zeta 312), Astronaut; He is a veteran of five space missions and lived on the International Space Station for five and a half months.
 Major William H. Wiley (Alpha 11, 1st President of the Grand Lodge), major in the Union Army during the Civil War and United States Representative from New Jersey

Philanthropy and Service 
Ray Klinginsmith (Beta Iota 1), World President of Rotary International 2010-2011
David Hirsch (Alpha Beta 1078), Founder 21st Century Dads Foundation 2015-Present

Science and technology 
Edwin Howard Armstrong (Epsilon 70), inventor and the Father of FM Radio
Allen B. DuMont (Alpha 349), American scientist and inventor
James Hall (Alpha 38) Geologist and Paleontologist
Charles Hayden (Delta 24), MIT's Charles Hayden Memorial Library and the Boston Museum of Science's Charles Hayden Planetarium are named after him
Emil Praeger (Alpha 272),  American architect and civil engineer.
Raymie Stata (Delta Chapter - MIT) Inventor
Phil Agcaoili (Alpha 1387), Technologist, Cybersecurity Pioneer, and Entrepreneur.
Frederick Winslow Taylor (Gamma 53), ''Father of Scientific Management

Sports 

Al Brosky (Alpha Beta 563), Illinois safety and member of the College Football Hall of Fame.
Ray Clay (Gamma Kappa 35), ex-Chicago Bulls Announcer.
Lee Eilbracht (Alpha Beta 463), lead Illinois to four Big Ten baseball titles, and had a brief stint with the Chicago Cubs before becoming a scout for the Arizona Diamondbacks.
Ryan Mathews (Kappa Sigma 1141), NASCAR Camping World Truck Series driver for Bill Davis Racing.
Tom Penders (Alpha Pi 573), Head men's basketball coach at the University of Houston.
Frank Quilici (Beta Theta 54), former manager of the Minnesota Twins.
Bob Schaefer (Alpha Pi 570), former manager of the Kansas City Royals.
Jerry Tagge (Alpha Epsilon 916), National Championship American football quarterback for the 1970 and 1971 Nebraska Cornhuskers and the Green Bay Packers.
Steve Wright (Alpha Lambda 430), played on University of Alabama Sugar Bowl team, Green Bay fifth-round pick in 1964.

References

Lists of members of United States student societies
brothers